Acting Finance Director is the mid-senior probation position for managing the company's finances. It is often meant somebody is not fully qualified  for the Finance Director  or Chief financial officer. This person may not be so junior in appearance but junior in the  professional competency and experience, because a financial director of an established company must have finance qualifications  such as Master of Business Administration (MBA) mainstream in finance, Master of Finance from an accredited institution, Certified Financial Analyst (CFA) or had an accounting background, for example a Certified Public Accountant or work for any prestigious professional corporations such as Ernst & Young, PricewaterhouseCoopers, Deloitte or KMPG or any renowned asset management company.

References

Finance occupations